Sir John Verity (1892 – 9 April 1970) was a British expatriate judge who was Chief Justice of Zanzibar from 1939 until his appointment as Chief Justice of British Guiana in 1941. He was appointed Chief Justice of Nigeria in 1945.

Early life, family and education
Verity was born in London, the son of Rev. Heron Beresford Verity. He attended Vale College, Thanet then Diocesan College, British Honduras."

Career
He was appointed Puisne Judge in British Guiana in 1936. In 1939, he became Chief Justice of Zanzibar. After the end of his tenure as Chief Justice of Nigeria (1946–54), Verity was commissioner of Law Revision, Nigeria and co-authored a report with Fatayi Williams on the revised laws of Western Nigeria.

Personal life
On 25 February 1918, Verity married Grace Rochat, the daughter of Mabel Rochat. Grace was his first cousin; they were both grandchildren of Charles Felix Verity of Vale Lodge, Winkfield Berkshire.

References

1892 births
1970 deaths
British people in British Guiana
British people in British Nigeria
British expatriates in Zanzibar
Chief justices of Nigeria
Chief justices of Tanzania
Lawyers from London
People from colonial Nigeria
20th-century English lawyers